Kaputt Mundi is a 1998 Italian comedy drama film directed by Marco Risi. It is based on the short story  L'ultimo capodanno dell'umanità by Niccolò Ammaniti.

Cast 
Monica Bellucci: Giulia Giovannini	
Marco Giallini: Enzo Di Girolamo	
Angela Finocchiaro: signora Rinaldi	
Claudio Santamaria: Cristiano Carucci
Iva Zanicchi: Gina Carucci	
Giorgio Tirabassi: Augusto Carbone
Ricky Memphis: Orecchino	
Adriano Pappalardo: Mastino di Dio 
Piero Natoli: Vittorio Trodini
Francesca D'Aloja: Lisa Faraone
Alessandro Haber: avv. Rinaldi
Giuseppe Fiorello: Gaetano Malacozza
Ludovica Modugno: Filomena
Antonella Steni: Esa Giovannini  
Maria Monti: Scintilla

See also   
 List of Italian films of 1998

References

External links

1998 films
1998 comedy-drama films
Films directed by Marco Risi
Italian comedy-drama films
1990s Italian-language films
1990s Italian films